Mission to Zyxx is an improvised, longform, science fiction space opera podcast on the Maximum Fun network. Before Maximum Fun, it was on Audioboom. The show follows a team of ambassadors (and their ship, The Bargarean Jade) as they attempt to establish diplomatic relations with planets in the remote and chaotic Zyxx Quadrant of the Tremillion Sector. It frequently parodies common science fiction tropes from franchises such as Star Trek, Battlestar Galactica, and Star Wars. At the start of Season 1, they work for the Federated Alliance, which recently defeated the evil Galactic Monarchy. As of 2022 there are five completed seasons, the fifth being the final season which premiered April 29, 2021 and ran through September 22, 2022.  On Apple Podcasts, Mission to Zyxx has a 4.9/5.0 based on 2.6K ratings.

The cast of the show are veterans of improv comedy performance, with all having performed with Upright Citizens Brigade and separately or in smaller groups with other improv casts. Additional credits include writing, performing and directing comedy content/shows such as  CollegeHumor and UCB Comedy Originals (Alden Ford, Jeremy Bent, Winston Noel), The Good Cop (Allie Kokesh), Last Week Tonight and Unbreakable Kimmy Schmidt (Moujan Zolfaghari). Co-creator Seth Lind is Director of Operations at the highly successful podcasts This American Life, Serial, and S-Town. Shane O'Connell, the show's sound engineer and designer, has worked with Ben Harper, Half Waif, and NAO.

Format

Production 
The podcast is improvised by its comedian cast and recorded by Shane O'Connell, who also performs subsequent sound design and mixing. Editing is done by Seth Lind, Alden Ford, and Jeremy Bent. Each week there is a special guest comedian who plays an inhabitant of the Zyxx Quadrant that encounters the crew. The guest pitches two or three episode ideas to the main cast, and one is picked that fits best with the story arc of the show. Filmmaker Magazine interviewed the cast and highlighted the combination of improv comedy and longform narration as a major source of creativity and freedom for the podcast.

Episode structure 

Podcast episodes are about 30 minutes, edited down from an initial 60-90 minute recording. Each episode opens with an opening crawl narration by Jeremy Crutchley. As the story progresses, the narration changes to reflect the happenings of the Zyxx Quadrant, the Tremillion Sector, and the entire galaxy. The series introduction for the first season is: The period of civil war has ended. The rebels have defeated the evil Galactic Monarchy and established the harmonious Federated Alliance. It’s totally less evil. Now to restore diplomatic relations between systems, the Federated Alliance has deployed teams of ambassadors throughout the galaxy. The Alliance’s newest recruit, a young farm boy named Pleck Decksetter steps aboard the starship Bargarean Jade to embark on his first diplomatic mission: a MISSION. TO. ZYXX! The show also occasionally releases live episodes set in previous eras/seasons.

Advertising breaks 
Like many podcasts, Mission to Zyxx generates revenue through sponsored advertisements in the form of advertising breaks. This podcasts is unusual, however, as these are done by the voice actors or guests as minor characters from the show, delivered in-character. The ad breaks are canon, consistent with the show's characterizations and events, occasionally delivering minor plot points or foreshadowing for the main storyline.

Cast and characters

Main cast

Ambassador Pleck Decksetter (played by Alden Ford). A young Tellurian farm-boy from the planet Rangus VI.
Security Officer Dar (played by Allie Kokesh).
Protocol and Diplomatic Relations Droid C-53 (played by Jeremy Bent).
Junior Missions Operations Manager Nermut Bundaloy (played by Seth Lind).
The Bargarean Jade, aka Bargie (played by Moujan Zolfaghari). The sentient spaceship the crew calls home.

Other cast

 Clone Light Infantry Nomadic Troopers (C.L.I.N.T.s) (played by Winston Noel). Clone soldiers that enforce the laws of the Federated Alliance. They are all business at first, but scratch the surface and they are catty and petty. Each CLINT hates every other CLINT and is always shit-talking the rest of them, never quite grasping that they are all exact clones.

Plot

Season 1
The Alliance's newest recruit is Ambassador Pleck Decksetter, a naive, gung-ho farm boy whose crew includes trusty, know-it-all droid C-53, and hulking, omnisexual security officer DAR.  They travel aboard the outdated, sentient starship The Bargerian Jade - aka Bargie - who has as many ex-husbands as stories about her glory days. Their mission is nominally overseen by junior Missions Operation Manager Nermut Bundaloy, a striving, entry-level bureaucrat yearning for respect.

Season 2 
Mission to Zyxx returns after dealing a crippling blow to the Federated Alliance, Pleck Decksetter and his intrepid crew find their way to the Rebellion, where they are welcomed as emissaries with the missive: Long Live the Rebellion! With a little more experience and understanding of the Zyxx Quadrant, the crew make their way through the galaxy with help from Beano and The Space.

Season 3 
Mission to Zyxx is back. Thanks to Beano's noble sacrifice, the Crew has survived the Battle of the Planet Crushers only to find themselves stranded on the opulent planet Holowood. Zima Warrior Pleck Decksetter, with the help of his newly found acolyte AJ, brings everyone back together, and they set out to rally forces across the galaxy to face down Emperor Nermut Bundaloy, ensconced in the Zyxx Quadrant.

Season 4 
In this season, the crew of the Bargarian Jade must locate Leader of the Rebellion Seesu Gundu, in the hopes of reuniting the galaxy after the defeat of Emperor Bundaloy, and the formation of the Allwheat (which looks like the love child of a quasar and all your regrets). The crew must facilitate an election, come to terms with parenthood, understand their changing relationships with one another and the pliable nature of time and space, and meet weird bug creatures and stuff.

Season 5  
In this Final Season, the crew of the Bargarian Jade find themselves in a galaxy far, far, away. Rescued from certain doom by the pan-galactic representatives, the Themm, the crew is brought on to continue the Themm's mission of outreach and diplomacy, in exchange for resources and aid in finding their way back to home. Meanwhile, in the Zyxx quadrant, the dreaded Kor Balevore enacts his plan for galactic domination, gathering allies in unlikely places, wreaking destruction on the unwary, and throwing the balance of the space out of wack. The adventures of our intrepid heroes culminate in the final push to return to something resembling peace and prosperity, to fulfill their true selves in whatever form that may be, and meet (or become?) weird bug creatures and stuff.

Cultural references

Star Wars 
Like Star Wars, Mission to Zyxx is a space opera. Zyxx makes several references to Star Wars, including the CLINTs (referencing Star Wars' Clone Troopers) and "The Space" (referencing Star Wars' The Force). Rather than the Force's Light and Dark sides, Zyxx has "Fresh" and "Wack," respectively. Zyxx also has Zima warriors that fight with woodsabers (sticks) - analogous to Star Wars' Jedi warriors and their lightsabers.

Hello from the Magic Tavern 
Show co-creator Alden Ford has cited the Chicago-based improv podcast Hello from the Magic Tavern set in a Narnia/Middle-Earth-like fantasy realm as partial inspiration for the format of Mission to Zyxx.

Star Trek 
The concept of diplomatic relations missions mirrors that of diplomat crews in the Star Trek universe. 

An episode of the podcast is named The Worry with Wiffles and has a similar plot in a direct homage to one of the most famous episodes of Star Trek, The Trouble with Tribbles.

Reception 
In their Culture section, Newsweek covered the production of the first series. Air & Space Magazine interviewed the cast after the first season. Vulture, an entertainment news website, listed Mission to Zyxx as one of "100 Great Podcasts Worth Listening to." The podcast was also number one on a Salon list of unpredictable improv podcasts.

Charles Pulliam-Moore of Gizmodo praised the show, calling it "the best scifi podcast you're probably not listening to...yet," and "proof that [podcasts have] still so much untapped potential, particularly for fictional work." He later reviewed Season 3, which he called "bolder" and "taking the piss out of Star Wars in the freshest way."

As of November 2019, the podcast website Podbay shows Mission to Zyxx has an average audience review of 4.8 out of 5 based on 2325 reviews.

Nick Douglas of LifeHacker wrote "Mission to Zyxx might be the best podcast. This science fiction comedy—a mix of Star Trek, Star Wars, and The Hitchhiker’s Guide to the Galaxy—that leans on original jokes instead of references, is definitely the best of the current wave of fictional podcasts, partly because of its unique process." Douglas featured the podcast's cast on the How I Work series, which "asks heroes, experts, and all-around productive people to share their shortcuts, workspaces, routines, and more."

The Season 2 opener was ranked 7th in IndieWire's "The 50 Best Podcast Episodes of 2018." It was also nominated for the iHeartRadio Podcast Awards 2019 for the category "Best Scripted Podcast" (won by Wolverine: The Long Night).

References

External links 
 
 Official Twitter

Audio podcasts
Comedy and humor podcasts
Improvisational podcasts
2017 podcast debuts
Science fiction podcasts